Sticta aongstroemii is a species of corticolous (bark-dwelling, foliose lichen in the family Peltigeraceae. It is found in the southern part of the Atlantic Forest of Brazil.

Taxonomy

The lichen was formally described in 2018 by Manuela Dal-Forno, Bibiana Moncada, and Robert Lücking. It has previously been included in the broadly defined concept of Sticta damicornis, but various molecular phylogenetic studies showed that there were multiple distinct cryptic species included under this name. S. aongstroemii was actually first described by Johannes Müller Argoviensis in 1881 as S. laciniata var. trichophora, based on collections made from Minas Gerais and Rio de Janeiro. However, the varietal epithet trichophora has been used as the species epithet for an unrelated species of Sticta by Edvard August Vainio in 1913, so Müller's usage is "blocked", and thus the replacement name, Sticta aongstroemii was proposed. The new epithet honours Swedish bryologist Johan Ångström, who collected the type specimen.

Description

Sticta aongstroemii is distinguished from other green algal-partnering Sticta species because of its unique characteristics. Additionally, it has densely packed marginal apothecia that are contrasting with the noticeable, whitish . Moreover, Sticta aongstroemii has a branching pattern that is anisotomous (a branching pattern where the lobes grow at different angles) and the lobes are growing at an angle of approximately 45–60°. Furthermore, it has a thin but distinct, dark brown lower .

References

aongstroemii
Lichen species
Lichens described in 2018
Lichens of Brazil
Taxa named by Robert Lücking